is a Japanese football manager and a former player.

Playing career
Kobayashi was born in Unzen on August 24, 1960. After graduating from Osaka University of Commerce, he joined Mazda in 1983. He played until 1992.

Coaching career
After retirement, Kobayashi started coaching career at Mazda (later Sanfrecce Hiroshima). He became a coach for top team and manager for youth team until 1999. He moved to Avispa Fukuoka in 2000, and Oita Trinita in 2001. In June 2001, at Oita Trinita, he was promoted to manager. In 2002, he led the club to won J2 League champions and the club was promoted to J1 League. He managed until 2003. In July 2004, he signed with Cerezo Osaka and managed until April 2006. After that, he managed J2 League club Montedio Yamagata (2008-2011), Tokushima Vortis (2012-2015) and Shimizu S-Pulse (2016-2017). He managed 4 J2 League clubs and he promoted all clubs to J1 League. In 2019, he signed with J3 League club Giravanz Kitakyushu.

Club statistics

Managerial statistics
Update; January 21, 2020

References

External links

Montedio Yamagata

1960 births
Living people
Osaka University of Commerce alumni
Association football people from Nagasaki Prefecture
Japanese footballers
Japan Soccer League players
Sanfrecce Hiroshima players
Japanese football managers
J1 League managers
J2 League managers
J3 League managers
Oita Trinita managers
Cerezo Osaka managers
Montedio Yamagata managers
Tokushima Vortis managers
Shimizu S-Pulse managers
Giravanz Kitakyushu managers
Association football forwards